The discography of Australian band The Drones, consists of six studio albums, one compilation album, nine live albums, three EPs and 11 singles.

Albums

Studio albums

Live albums

Compilation albums

Extended plays

Singles

Live DVDs

References

External links
 

Discographies of Australian artists
Pop music group discographies
Rock music group discographies